The 2016 Stockport Metropolitan Borough Council election took place on 5 May 2016 to elect members of Stockport Metropolitan Borough Council in England. This was on the same day as other local elections. Stockport Council is elected in thirds which means that in each three member local ward, one councillor is elected every year, except every four years which is classed as fallow year. The last fallow year was 2013, when no local government elections took place in the borough. Those councillors elected with serve a four-year term expiring in 2020, the term was subsequently extended for a further year due to the deferral of the 2020 UK local elections.

Following the elections, the Lib Dem minority administration was replaced by a Labour minority administration. The Liberal Democrats had previously governed Stockport with a majority from 2002, and in a minority since 2011. This was able to occur as a result of a Liberal Democrat councillor defecting to Labour on election night, leaving Labour as the largest party with 23 councillors to the Liberal Democrats 21.

Election results by ward 
Asterix indicates incumbent in the Ward, and Bold names highlight winning candidate.

Bramhall North

Bramhall South

Bredbury & Woodley

Bredbury Green & Romiley

Brinnington & Central

Cheadle & Gatley

Cheadle Hulme North

Cheadle Hulme South

Davenport & Cale Green

Edgeley & Cheadle Heath

Hazel Grove

Heald Green

Heatons North

Heatons South

Manor
Sue Derbyshire had been the leader of Stockport Council before she lost her seat in this election.

Marple North

Marple South

Offerton
Laura Booth was previously the Labour Party councillor for Offerton. She left Labour in 2014 and joined the Lib Dems in 2015.

Reddish North

Reddish South

Stepping Hill

Changes since this election

Brinnington & Central

References

2016 English local elections
2016
2010s in Greater Manchester